Moshe Sharett (born Moshe Chertok‎ 15 October 1894 – 7 July 1965) was a Russian-born Israeli politician who served as Israel's second prime minister from 1954 to 1955. A member of Mapai, Sharett's term was both preceded and succeeded by the premiership of David Ben-Gurion. Sharett also served as the country's first foreign minister between 1948 and 1956.

Biography
Born in Kherson in the Russian Empire (today in Ukraine), Sharett immigrated to Ottoman Palestine as a child in 1906. For two years, 1906–1907, the family lived in a rented house in the village of Ein-Sinya, north of Ramallah. In 1910 his family moved to Jaffa, then became one of the founding families of Tel Aviv.

He graduated from the first class of the Herzliya Hebrew High School, even studying music at the Shulamit Conservatory. He then went to Constantinople to study law at Istanbul University, the same university at which Yitzhak Ben-Zvi and David Ben-Gurion studied. However, his time there was cut short due to the outbreak of World War I. He served a commission as First Lieutenant in the Ottoman Army, working as an interpreter.

In 1922, Sharett married Tzippora Meirov, with whom he had two sons, Ya'akov and Haim, and a daughter, Yael.

Political career

After the war, he worked as an Arab affairs and land purchase agent for the Assembly of Representatives of the Yishuv. He also became a member of Ahdut Ha'Avoda, and later of Mapai.

In 1922, he attended the London School of Economics, and worked for the British Poale Zion and actively edited the Workers of Zion. One of the people he met while in London was Chaim Weizmann. He then worked on the Davar newspaper from 1925 until 1931.

In 1931, after returning to Mandatory Palestine, he became the secretary of the Jewish Agency's political department. After the assassination of Haim Arlosoroff in 1933 he became its head.

During the war via his wife Zipporah, Sharett became embroiled in the question of emigration of refugee Jews stranded in Europe and the East. Some Polish refugees, children with and without parents were deported to Tehran with the Soviet's agreement. The "Tehran Children" became a cause celèbre in the Yishuv. Sharett flew to Tehran to negotiate their return to Palestine.

The success of these negotiations and others was a hallmark of Sharett's more cerebral approach to practical problems. He met with Tel Aviv bound Hungarian Jewish refugee representative Joel Brand, fresh off the plane from Budapest. Yishuv leadership mistrusted Brand, and the British thought him a criminal.

Sharett's response was to hand the self-appointed liberator over to the British authorities, who drove Brand to prison in Egypt. Sharett's General Zionism was deeply concerned in making Palestine a commercially viable home land; secondary was the deep emotional concerns of the murder in the Diaspora, which, by 1942, was in German hands.

Like Weizmann, whom he admired, Sharett was a principled Zionist, an implacable opponent of fascism, and a practical realist, prepared to co-operate fully with the Mandate.

Sharett, as Ben-Gurion's ally, denounced Irgun's assassination squads on 13 December 1947, accusing them of playing to public feelings. Atrocities escalated, mainly upon Jews, but with reciprocal revenge killings; by the end of the war 6,000 Palestinian Jews, 1% of the population, had died. Sharett held the foreign policy post under the Agency until the formation of Israel in 1948.

Independence

Sharett was one of the signatories of Israel's Declaration of Independence. During the 1948 Arab–Israeli War, he was Foreign Minister for the Provisional Government of Israel. Yigal Allon went to see Sharett at Tel Binyamin (Ramat Gan), his home. 

Allon wanted permission to capture El-Arish, destroy the base to prevent it falling into British hands. Allon could not find Ben-Gurion at Tel Aviv, because the Prime Minister was at Tiberias. However, Sharett told the general that it would be unconstitutional to order an attack over the head of the Prime Minister, and also thought it would provoke the British to side with the Egyptians. When Allon explained a plan to feint an Egyptian withdrawal before invading the area between Raffah and Gaza, well within Israel's borders, Sharett approved it; but on the telephone Ben-Gurion totally rejected the proposal.

President Truman ordered troop withdrawals from the war zone, and on 1 Jan 1949, Israeli troops left Sinai and evacuated El-Arish. After a brief Egyptian counter-attack a ceasefire was called, with Egyptian troops marooned in the Faluja Pocket; Israelis had saved the Negev for good.

Sharett was elected to the Knesset in the first Israeli election in 1949, and served as Minister of Foreign Affairs. On 10 March he was made part of the first cabinet. An armistice was signed with Lebanon that led to Israel's withdrawal from southern Lebanon on 23 March. International negotiations hosted by Britain took place on the Greek island of Rhodes at Suneh, King Abdullah's residence when Israel's emissaries, Yigael Yadin and Walter Eytan signed with Transjordan. Knowing the Jordanian position on the Hebron Hills, Yadin told Sharett that surrounded by hostile Arab states, Israel had to sign the Transjordan over to Iraq. American Dr. Ralph Bunche, who drafted the UN treaty for Sharett's office, received the Nobel Peace Prize. The final agreement was signed at the "Grande Albergo delle Rose" in Rhodes (now the Casino Rodos) on 3 April 1949.

Ominous violence lay ahead for the new state, warned Sharett during a debate on 15 June, in which he reminded the Jewish people of their vital interests. A fourth and final agreement was signed with Syria on 17 July; the 1947–1949 Palestine war had lasted one year and seven months. In the elections that followed, Mapai formed a coalition, deliberately excluding Herut and the Communists at Ben-Gurion's behest. 

As Foreign Minister, Sharett established diplomatic relations with many nations, and helped to bring about Israel's admission to the UN. He continuously held this role until he retired in June 1956 including during his period as Prime Minister.

In the debate on how to deal with the increasing infiltration of fedayeen across the borders in the years leading to the 1956 Suez Crisis, Sharett was sceptical of the reprisal operations being carried out by the Israeli military.

Sharett met with Pius XII in 1952 in an attempt to improve relations with the Holy See, although this was to no avail.

Prime minister
David Ben-Gurion retired from politics (temporarily as it turned out) in January 1954, and Sharett was chosen by the party to take his place. During his time as Prime Minister (the fifth and sixth governments of Israel), the Arab-Israeli conflict intensified, particularly with Nasser's Egypt. The Lavon Affair, which resulted in the resignation of Pinhas Lavon, the Defense Minister, brought down the government. When David Ben-Gurion returned to the cabinet, Pinchas Lavon was a civilian adviser to Prime Minister Sharett. But when he returned from the war, he was presented with a fait accompli; it had been the convention, but no longer for a career diplomat, to be chosen to become a Minister of Defense, a portfolio once controlled by the Prime Minister's office, now taken by Ben-Gurion.

Lavon Affair 
In 1954, three cells of local Jews living in Egypt and one from Israel proper were activated as terror groups to sabotage in Alexandria and Cairo on the orders of a secretive Unit 131 of Israeli Intelligence. The Israelis welcomed the British presence in Nasser's Egypt. Israel had formed an alliance with the European powers Britain and France. Britain had helped found the State of Israel, encouraged socialism, and fostered a sense of accountable democracy. Israel viewed Britain's historic role in Cairo as a convenient buffer against potential threatening incursions into Israel's borders.

A group of Israeli youths were ardent Zionist military trainees, but had little real experience of war. They were influenced by their charismatic leader and handler, Avri Elad. In July 1954 they threw firebombs into the American libraries of Cairo and Alexandria, with little damage, and cinemas in Cairo. But 13 youths were arrested, and then tortured by the Egyptians. Two of the prisoners, including the Israeli agent Meir Max Bineth, committed suicide, and three were sent to prison. Sharett soon discovered that operations were being prepared for execution in other Arab capitals. When the news broke over Cairo Radio in summer 1954, Sharett turned to Minister for Labour Golda Meir for help. The Minister of Defense, Pinchas Lavon, and his Head of Military Intelligence, Binyamin Gibli, both declared each other as the responsible party. The real orders were transmitted in code over the radio in the form of housewives cookery recipes.

Mapai was split over the crisis. Sharett called for a Public Inquiry led by a Judge of the Supreme Court, Yitzhak Olshan, and a former Chief of Staff, Ya'akov Dori. Sharett had wanted to appoint Moshe Dayan as Minister of Defense but was aware that he was a controversial figure. There were those who defended his stubbornness as a military genius, and those who saw him as divisive. But criticism of Lavon was mounting. Mapai demanded the resignation of Dayan, Gibli and Lavon. Sharett appealed to a sense of fairness from Colonel Nasser, but to no avail. A guilty verdict was entered over the heads of the prisoners in Cairo. On 31 January 1955 two of the defendants, Moshe Marzouk and Shmuel Azar were hanged, found guilty of spying.

Lavon offered to resign from the Defense Ministry on 2 February 1955, the same day Sharett and Golda Meir traveled to Sde Boker to see Ben-Gurion. Lavon's resignation was accepted on 18 February. Ben-Gurion agreed to come out of retirement to fill the defense portfolio, and four months later he replaced Sharett as PM, while Sharett stayed as Foreign Minister. Olshan-Dori's final judicial report exposed the difficulty of political management in the Defense Ministry with the cabinet conflicts emerging from Ben-Gurion's stewardship.

Sharett's efforts to unblock the diplomatic impasse had failed. Nasser still prevented access to the Suez Canal. Israeli shipments of arms to defend the state dried up at a time when Arab belligerency was rising. Sharett might have learned from Weizmann's experience at befriending the consummate politician Ben-Gurion; Sharett also believed he could install him as his subordinate. Ben-Gurion had been out of office for a year, but returned to demand that Dayan be reappointed. Ben-Gurion spoke regularly with socialist leaders Dayan and Shimon Peres. A few weeks later an Israeli was murdered by infiltrators near the border. Ben-Gurion and Dayan immediately demanded approval of the planned Operation Black Arrow, which involved attacking Gaza. Sharett had attempted to be pacifistic and restrained during his premiership, but was overtaken by the vocal elements in Mapai and their growing electoral support in the run-up to a General election.

After the military disaster at Qibya, in which Dayan had caused civilians to be killed, he was forced to change Israeli Defense Forces (IDF) policy towards targeting military installations on 28 February 1955. Sharett was concerned that casualties should be kept to an absolute minimum; 8 Israelis and 37 Egyptians died in an operation that was the most bloody since the armistice of 1949. An adjutant at the ministry, Nehemia Argov, wrote to Foreign Minister and PM Sharett to report the Gaza Raid as 8 dead and 8 wounded. The wounded were sent to Kaplan Hospital.

Principles of moderation
Sharett's diary included passages in which he bewailed the senseless denigration of duty lacking credibility. He harked back to the days of Havlagah when in the 1930s both he, Sharett and Ben-Gurion had pursued a policy of self-restraint in matters military. Sharett abhorred vengeful killing, he regarded these acts as emotional over-wrought responses in which involuntary killing was devoid of moral sentiment. A policy of reprisal merely sought to justify the excessive use of force. Sharett's pacific doctrine was diluted by both Ben-Gurion and Minister of Defense Dayan, and Operational commander of the Paratroop Brigade, Sharon. Sharett opposed any move that would attract moral outcry of European powers and an arms trade embargo.

Last months as foreign minister
At the next elections in November 1955, Ben-Gurion replaced Sharett as head of the list and became prime minister again. Sharett retained his role as Foreign Minister under the new government of Ben-Gurion. Ben-Gurion justified much of his policy on the siege mentality of a minority of Jews living within 57 times as many Arabs living in 215 times the land area. Sharett came to see Nasser as "suffering from delusions of grandeur" with an almost Hitlerite ambition to export revolution abroad.

Shimon Peres was sent to London and Paris to drum up arms. He made a significant deal with France for jets and artillery. Peres, later a Prime Minister of Israel, was praised from the Knesset for handling the complexities of the 4th Republic. The uneasy diplomatic language between Nasser and Israel that had characterised the post-1949 period turned into open hostility. Nasser ended even secretive clandestine contacts. Within days of the Gaza Raid Iraq aligned in a Baghdad Pact with Turkey.

Ben-Gurion decided to replace Sharett as Foreign Minister with someone more sympathetic to his views, Golda Meir. The cabinet voted 35 to 7 in favour of resignation, but 75 members of the Central Committee abstained. The British and French would provide a shield for Israel against sanctions. Nasser proclaimed a determination to set the Palestinians free. The Egyptian army was very certain of success; the Syrians announced a "war against imperialism, Zionism and Israel". According to Ben-Gurion, the Soviet Encyclopaedia now declared the Arab-Israeli War of Independence in 1948 "was caused by American Imperialism".

Retirement
After stepping down as Minister of Foreign Affairs on 18 June 1956, in protest at the new government's bellicose policy which he thought dangerously precipitate, Sharett decided to retire. During his retirement he became chairman of Am Oved publishing house, Chairman of Beit Berl College, and Chairman of the World Zionist Organization and the Jewish Agency. He died in Jerusalem in 1965, and was buried in Tel Aviv's Trumpeldor Cemetery.

Commemoration 

Sharett's personal diaries, first published by his son Yaakov in 1978, have proved to be an important source for Israeli history. In 2007, the Moshe Sharett Heritage Society, the foundation that Yaakov established to care for Sharett's legacy, discovered a file of thousands of passages that had been omitted from the published edition. They included "shocking revelations" about defense minister Pinhas Lavon. A new edition published was complete, apart from a few words still classified.

Many cities have streets and neighborhoods named after him.

From 1988 to 2017, Sharett appeared on the 20 NIS bills. The bill first featured Sharett, with the names of his books in small print, and with a small image of him presenting the Israeli flag to the United Nations in 1949. On the back of the bill, there was an image of the Herzliya Hebrew High School, from which he graduated. In 1998, the bill went through a graphic revision, with the list of Sharett's books on the front side being replaced by part of his 1949 speech to the UN. The back side then featured an image of Jewish Brigade volunteers, part of a speech by Sharett on the radio after visiting the Brigade in Italy, and the list of his books in small print. In November 2017, Sharett's portrait was replaced with that of Rachel Bluwstein.

Gallery

References

Bibliography

External links

Moshe Sharett Heritage Society, official website
"Moshe Sharett" at Jewish Virtual Library
"Moshe Sharett" at Jewish Agency for Israel
The Central Zionist Archives in Jerusalem site: The Office of Moshe Sharett (S65), Personal papers (A245).
Livia Rokach: Israel's Sacred Terrorism: A Study Based on Moshe Sharett's Personal Diary and Other Documents, foreword by Noam Chomsky, 1980.
Yaakov Sharet's fall from Zionism and the Sharett family saga in Haaretz, 19 Sep 2021 (registration needed).

1894 births
1965 deaths
Darülfünun alumni
Alumni of the London School of Economics
Heads of the Jewish Agency for Israel
Herzliya Hebrew Gymnasium alumni
Emigrants from the Russian Empire to the Ottoman Empire
Istanbul University Faculty of Law alumni
Jewish Agency for Israel
Jewish Israeli politicians
Ashkenazi Jews in Mandatory Palestine
Ashkenazi Jews in Ottoman Palestine
Mapai leaders
Members of the 1st Knesset (1949–1951)
Members of the 2nd Knesset (1951–1955)
Members of the 3rd Knesset (1955–1959)
Members of the 4th Knesset (1959–1961)
Members of the 5th Knesset (1961–1965)
Members of the Assembly of Representatives (Mandatory Palestine)
Ministers of Foreign Affairs of Israel
Ottoman military personnel of World War I
Prime Ministers of Israel
Signatories of the Israeli Declaration of Independence
Ukrainian Jews
Ukrainian Zionists
Deaths from cancer in Israel
Burials at Trumpeldor Cemetery